The Drama Desk Award for Outstanding Lighting Design is an annual award presented by Drama Desk in recognition of achievements in the theatre among Broadway, Off Broadway and Off-Off Broadway productions. In the 2009 ceremony, the category was separated to honor both plays and musicals, but was reinstated as a singular category the following year.

Winners and nominees

1970s

1980s

1990s

2000s

2010s

See also
 Laurence Olivier Award for Best Lighting Design
 Tony Award for Best Lighting Design

References

External links
 Drama Desk official website

Lighting Design